Francis Euclides Martes Suazo (born November 24, 1995) is a Dominican professional baseball pitcher for the Toros de Tijuana of the Mexican League. Martes was signed by the Miami Marlins as an international free agent in 2012. He made his Major League Baseball (MLB) debut in 2017 with the Houston Astros.

Career

Miami Marlins
Martes was signed by the Miami Marlins as an international free agent in November 2012. He made his professional debut in 2013 with the Dominican Summer League Marlins, logging a 3–3 record and 3.04 ERA in 12 appearances. He began the 2014 season with the GCL Marlins, posting a 2–2 record and 5.18 ERA in 8 games.

Houston Astros
On July 31, 2014, Martes along with Colin Moran and Jake Marisnick were traded from the Marlins to the Houston Astros for Jarred Cosart, Enrique Hernández and Austin Wates. Martes started 2015 with the Quad Cities River Bandits. He was later that season promoted to the Lancaster JetHawks and Double-A Corpus Christi Hooks. He returned to Corpus Christi in 2016 and after the season played in the Arizona Fall League. The Astros invited Martes to spring training as a non-roster player in 2017. Martes began the 2017 season with the Fresno Grizzlies of the Class AAA Pacific Coast League.

The Astros promoted Martes to the MLB for the first time on June 8, 2017. He made his MLB debut the next day. In 32 appearances (4 starts) of 2017, Martes had a 5–2 record and a 5.80 ERA. He returned to Fresno in 2018. On August 15, 2018, Martes underwent Tommy John surgery. On March 12, 2019, Martes was suspended for 80 games for using clomiphene in a violation of the MLB Joint Drug Prevention & Treatment program. On February 17, 2020, Martes was suspended for 162 games for another violation of the MLB Joint Drug Prevention & Treatment program, this time for using boldenone.

On June 19, 2021, Martes was activated off of the restricted list and optioned to the Triple-A Sugar Land Skeeters. After struggling to an 0–3 record and 10.80 ERA in 7 appearances with Sugar Land, Martes was designated for assignment by Houston on June 30. He was outrighted to Sugar Land on July 4. He was released on August 17, 2021.

Mexican League
On April 18, 2022, Martes signed with the Diablos Rojos del México of the Mexican League. In 10 starts, he went 3–1 with a 6.33 ERA and 57 strikeouts in  innings. Martes was waived on June 29, 2022. On June 30, 2022, Martes was claimed off waivers by the Guerreros de Oaxaca. In 6 starts, he posted a 2–1 record with a 7.45 ERA and 32 strikeouts in 29 innings. On December 29, 2022, Martes was traded to the Toros de Tijuana in exchange for Fernando Rodney.

See also
List of Major League Baseball players suspended for performance-enhancing drugs

References

External links

1995 births
Living people
Corpus Christi Hooks players
Diablos Rojos del México players
Dominican Republic expatriate baseball players in Mexico
Dominican Republic expatriate baseball players in the United States
Dominican Republic sportspeople in doping cases
Dominican Summer League Marlins players
Fresno Grizzlies players
Glendale Desert Dogs players
Gulf Coast Astros players
Gulf Coast Marlins players
Guerreros de Oaxaca players
Houston Astros players
Lancaster JetHawks players
Leones del Escogido players
Major League Baseball pitchers
Major League Baseball players from the Dominican Republic
Major League Baseball players suspended for drug offenses
People from Cotuí
Quad Cities River Bandits players
Sugar Land Skeeters players